Virginia Doris Heinlein (nee Gerstenfeld; April 22, 1916 – January 18, 2003) was an American chemist, biochemist, engineer, and the third wife and muse of Robert A. Heinlein, a prominent and successful author often considered one of the "Big Three" of science fiction (along with Isaac Asimov and Arthur C. Clarke).

Life and career
Born to George Joseph and Jeanne D Gerstenfeld (nee Rosenthal)', Virginia was raised in Brooklyn with her brother Leon. A redheaded organic chemist and biochemist, she served as an inspiration for many of the active and talented red-haired women in Heinlein's stories. She met Robert when they both worked at the Naval Air Experimental Station in Philadelphia when she was a lieutenant in the WAVES in the U.S. Navy in World War II. She moved to Los Angeles in 1946 to take an advanced degree, where Heinlein had already relocated after the war. They married on October 21, 1948, in Raton, New Mexico. Shortly thereafter they moved to Colorado, but in 1965 her health was chronically affected by the altitude, so the couple moved to Bonny Doon, California.

Prior to a trip to the Soviet Union, where they happened to be when Francis Gary Powers was shot down, Virginia learned to speak Russian, which proved invaluable in talking with local citizens. She was highly esteemed among her husband's fans for her exceptional willingness to correspond with them, a practice that continued until her last days, with activity in a Usenet newsgroup devoted to Heinlein fans. She was touched when other users sent her Mother's Day greetings as an homage to her bestowing the title of "Heinlein's Children" on Robert's fans worldwide.

After Robert's death in 1988, she moved from California to Florida, where she edited a collection of his letters and writings, published in 1989 as Grumbles from the Grave. She authorised the publication of Tramp Royale and longer editions of previously published works Stranger in a Strange Land, The Puppet Masters, and Red Planet. In 1997 she established a literary society in her husband's name, the Heinlein Society.

References

External links
 
 Virginia Heinlein (1917-2003) - SFWA News Obituary at the Science Fiction Writers of America

1916 births
2003 deaths
People from Brooklyn
Robert A. Heinlein
Female United States Navy officers
Muses
WAVES personnel